Urimo is a Torricelli language of Papua New Guinea. It is spoken in Yaugiba village of Turubu Rural LLG, East Sepik Province.

References

Marienberg languages
Languages of East Sepik Province